Oxydisulfoton is a chemical compound used as an acaricide and insecticide. It is classified as an extremely hazardous substance in the United States as defined in Section 302 of the U.S. Emergency Planning and Community Right-to-Know Act (42 U.S.C. 11002), and is subject to strict reporting requirements by facilities which produce, store, or use it in significant quantities.

References

Organophosphate insecticides
Ethyl esters
Sulfoxides
Insecticides
Acaricides